.gq is the country code top-level domain (ccTLD) for Equatorial Guinea. Freenom relaunched the TLD on October 1, 2014, and domains became available for free on January 1, 2015.

The .gq registry allows the creation of emoji domain names.

History 
The .gq domain was launched in July 1997 by GETESA, the nation's prominent internet service provider.

In October 2014, domain company Freenom partnered with GETESA to try a business model which involved giving away .gq domain names for free. Before the public launch, there was a sunrise period to allow trademark holders to register their names. Public domain registration commenced on January 1, 2015.

Abuse 
Due to the lack of cost required to obtain a .gq domain, the TLD has been prone to usage for spam, phishing and other malicious purposes. A study conducted by internet security company Symantec found that 92% of the top 50 .gq websites were being used for "shady" purposes. Out of all of the websites on a .gq domain that were surveyed by Symantec, a whole 98.94% were being used for malicious purposes.

References

External links
 IANA .gq whois information

Country code top-level domains
Communications in Equatorial Guinea

sv:Toppdomän#G